The 1977 Idaho Vandals football team represented the University of Idaho in the 1977 NCAA Division I football season. The Vandals were led by fourth-year head coach Ed Troxel and were members of the Big Sky Conference, then in Division II. They played their home games at the Kibbie Dome, an indoor facility on campus in Moscow, Idaho.

Season

The Vandals suffered a tenth straight loss in the Battle of the Palouse with neighbor Washington State of the Pac-8, falling  at Martin Stadium in Pullman on

Boise State
The season concluded with a 30-point home loss to Boise State, held two days after Thanksgiving. The young rivalry took a new step in the fourth quarter, when the Broncos were up  and in control. Having thrown the ball sparingly in building its twenty-point lead, second-year head coach Jim Criner went heavily to the passing game. Boise scored a touchdown with less than two minutes left, then staged a successful onside kick and made a field goal with 

Boise State went undefeated in the Big Sky, but because of the late conclusion of their regular season, they had to decline a berth in the Division II playoffs, which started earlier  Conference runner-up Northern Arizona took their place and was shut out at home,  In the previous season, underdog Idaho had won the rivalry game in the season opener before a record crowd in Boise in Criner's debut as  At the time, the Broncos were three-time defending conference champions, all under previous head coach Tony Knap.

Division I
This was the last season prior to the creation of Division I-AA, which the Big Sky joined. Through 1977, the Big Sky was a Division II conference for football, except for Division I member Idaho, which moved down to I-AA in 1978. Idaho had maintained its upper division status in the NCAA by playing Division I non-conference opponents (and was ineligible for the Division II postseason). (Idaho was involuntarily dropped to the College Division  then returned to the University Division

Troxel fired
Five weeks after the season concluded, Troxel was asked for his resignation by new university president Richard Gibb on  An assistant under the preceding three head coaches and a former head coach of track and field, he had been at UI for an over  Very successful at Borah High School in Boise  Troxel returned to the high school ranks in 1978 at Kennewick High School, in the Tri-Cities of eastern  and built the Lions into winners; he coached through 1990, and died of cancer

Schedule

Idaho did not play Northern Arizona, so a non-conference game was designated to count in the standings for each team. Both were designated conference games were home games against Pacific Coast Athletic Association team. Idaho lost to Pacific, while Northern Arizona defeated Cal State Fullerton.

Roster

All-conference
Defensive tackle Tim Sanford and punter Ralph Lowe were name to the Big Sky all-conference team; Lowe was named to the second team as a placekicker.  Also on the second team were tackle Larry Coombs, center Joe Kramer, running back Robert Taylor, linebacker Chris Tormey, defensive end Joe Pellegrini, and defensive back

References

External links
Gem of the Mountains: 1978 University of Idaho yearbook – 1977 football season
Official game program: Idaho at Washington State –  November 12, 1977
Idaho Argonaut – student newspaper – 1977 editions

Idaho
Idaho Vandals football seasons
Idaho Vandals football